The House of Commons Treasury Committee (often referred to as the Treasury Select Committee) is a select committee of the House of Commons in the Parliament of the United Kingdom. The remit of the committee is to examine the expenditure, administration and policy of HM Treasury, with all of its agencies and associated bodies, including HM Revenue and Customs, the Bank of England, the Prudential Regulation Authority, the Financial Conduct Authority, the Royal Mint, and so on.

Since 2010 the Treasury Committee has taken on new powers, including the right to veto appointments to the independent Office for Budget Responsibility, and has forced the Financial Services Authority to publish a detailed report into its handling of the collapse of Royal Bank of Scotland.

Membership
As of February 2023, the members of the committee are as follows:

Changes since 2019

2017–2019 Parliament
The chair was elected on 12 July 2017, with the members of the committee being announced on 11 September 2017.

Changes 2017–2019

2015–2017 Parliament
The chair was elected on 18 June 2015, with members being announced on 8 July 2015.

Changes 2015–2017

2010–2015 Parliament
The chair was elected on 10 June 2010, with members being announced on 12 July 2010.

Changes 2010–2015

Chair of the Treasury Select Committee

Election results
From June 2010 chairs of select committees have been directly elected by a secret ballot of the whole House of Commons using the alternative vote system. Candidates with the fewest votes are eliminated and their votes redistributed until one remaining candidate has more than half of valid votes. Elections are held at the beginning of a parliament or in the event of a vacancy.

See also
Parliamentary committees of the United Kingdom

Valuation Office Agency (VOA) Inquiry 
On 1 February 2019, the Treasury Committee launched an inquiry looking into the impact of business rates and any unfairness in the system of rateable valuation operated by the VOA.  The inquiry heard evidence from many businesses and trade organisations. The findings of this inquiry outlined that the service was broken and public confidence had been eroded. In its reply to the inquiry, February 2020, the Government promised to make changes to business rates as part of a fundamental review of the VOA.

References

External links
Records of the Treasury Committee are kept at the Parliamentary Archives
Treasury Committee

Select Committees of the British House of Commons
HM Treasury